Mazher Jabalpuri ( – 21 April 2021) was a Pakistani sports writer and statistician who wrote more than 15 books on hockey.

Born in Jabalpur, Madhya Pradesh, Jabalpuri migrated to Pakistan at the age of 17 in 1947.

References

1930 births
2021 deaths
Hockey writers
20th-century Pakistani writers
People from Jabalpur district